The 1996 Segunda División B play-offs (Playoffs de Ascenso or Promoción de Ascenso) were the final playoffs for promotion from 1995–96 Segunda División B to the 1996–97 Segunda División. The four first placed teams in each of the four Segunda División B groups played the Playoffs de Ascenso and the four last placed teams in Segunda División were relegated to Segunda División B.

The teams play a league of four teams, divided into 4 groups.
The champion of each group is promoted to Segunda División.

Group A

League table

Results

Group B

League table

Results

Group C

League table

Results

Group D

League table

Results

Notes

External links

Segunda División B play-offs
1996 Spanish football leagues play-offs
play